James Ellsworth Lowe (May 7, 1923  – December 12, 2016) was an American singer-songwriter, best known for his 1956 number-one hit song, "The Green Door". He also served as a disc jockey and radio host and personality and was considered an expert on the popular music of the 1940s and 1950s.

Biography
Born in Springfield, Missouri, Lowe graduated from the University of Missouri in Columbia in 1948.  He worked for several radio stations in Springfield, Indianapolis and Chicago, before moving to WCBS in New York City in 1956.

A million-seller and gold record recipient, Lowe's 1956 hit "The Green Door" was written by Marvin Moore and Bob Davie. The song reached No. 8 in the UK Singles Chart in November 1956.

Lowe earlier wrote "Gambler's Guitar", a million-selling hit for Rusty Draper in 1953. His most notable run as a disc jockey was with WNEW AM in New York, from 1964.  Lowe also worked at WNBC AM in New York where he was heard both locally and on the coast-to-coast NBC Radio weekend program Monitor.

He retired in 2004 at the age of 81, and lived in Southampton, New York.    For contributions to the music industry, Lowe was honored with a star on the Hollywood Walk of Fame at 6341 Hollywood Boulevard.

Lowe died on December 12, 2016, at his home in East Hampton, Long Island, after a long illness.

Discography

Singles

References

External links
Jim Lowe information and partial discography
Jim Lowe information from Randy Wood: The Dot Records Story excerpt
[ Jim Lowe at Allmusic]
 WNEW tribute site

1923 births
2016 deaths
American country singer-songwriters
American male singer-songwriters
American radio DJs
Dot Records artists
Musicians from Springfield, Missouri
Singer-songwriters from Missouri
University of Missouri alumni
Country musicians from Missouri
Country musicians from New York (state)
Singer-songwriters from New York (state)